Caroline Friederike Friedrich (born 4 March 1749 in Friedrichstadt bei Dresden; died 20 January 1815 in Dresden) was a flower painter. She was court painter and a member of the Dresden Academy, and produced a number of admired bouquets in oil and water-colours.

See also
 List of German painters

References

 

1749 births
1815 deaths
18th-century German painters
19th-century German painters
Court painters
Flower artists
18th-century German women artists
19th-century German women artists
German women painters